Waikerie is a rural town in the Riverland region of South Australia on the south bank of the Murray River. The Sturt Highway passes to the south of the town at the top of the cliffs. There is a cable ferry crossing the river to provide vehicle access from the north side of the river. Waikerie is known for citrus growing, along with stone fruit and grapes.

Background 
The Ngawait people have inhabited the area for millennia. The river and surrounding land provided everything they needed - fish, shellfish, birds, kangaroos, and native fruits.

The town of Waikerie derives its name from Weikari, which is claimed to mean 'the rising'. However some linguistic anthropologists argue that the name refers to the spider creator god from local creation myths. These myths may originate in the emergence of many ghost moths (especially the giant swift moth Trictena argentata : Hepialidae) from the ground among the river red gums Eucalyptus camaldulensis after heavy rain.

Waikerie is in the District Council of Loxton Waikerie, the South Australian House of Assembly electoral district of Chaffey and the Australian House of Representatives Division of Barker. The historic former Irrigation Pumping Station Chimney in Scenic Lookout Reserve is listed on the South Australian Heritage Register.

Media
The main newspaper of the region is The River News, first published in July 1956 and founded as a direct result of the 1956 Murray River floods.

Waikerie Airport
Waikerie Airport is near Waikerie. It is home to the Waikerie Gliding Club. It has two runways 08/26 and 02/20. The flat dry terrain provides good thermals for gliding. Waikerie hosted the 14th World Gliding Championships in 1974.

Silo Art
In March 2019, the Waikerie silo art project was completed. South Australian artist Garry Duncan painted one silo with a semi-abstract river landscape and characterised native river creatures such as pelicans, ducks, frogs and rain moths. On the other silo, Jimmy Dvate from Melbourne painted a regent parrot, a yabby and the endangered Murray hardyhead fish.

Sport
Waikerie is home to the Waikerie Football Club, who currently play in the (Australian Rules) Riverland Football League. Former Adelaide Crows captain Mark Ricciuto is from Waikerie and played junior football with the club. 

Waikerie is also home to the  Sunline Speedway. The speedway has been home to Super Sedan drivers Wally Francombe (supercharged EH Holden), Robert Gwynne (Chevrolet Camaro), Noel Reichstein (Chevrolet Corvette) and twice (and inaugural) Australian Street Stock Champion, Neil Hoffman and his Chrysler Centura. Other classes that race at the Speedway include Modified Sedans, Formula 500s, 360 Sprintcars, AMCA Nationals and Late Models.

Notable people from Waikerie

Notable people born, went to school or lived in Waikerie include:

Sir Donald (Don) George Anderson, CBE (1917-1975) – Director-General of Civil Aviation and later chairman of Qantas Airways Ltd.
John Neil (Neil) Andrew, AO, FTSE (1944- ) – Speaker of the House of Representatives, Federal Parliament of Australia. Chair, Murray–Darling Basin Authority
Meredith Arnold, AO – Awarded AO in 2013 for her involvement with the local historical society, the Waikerie District Community Committee and her volunteer work at the Waikerie High School and hospital.
Warwick (Rick) Maxwell Darling (1957- ) – Cricketer, played for South Australia and Australia
Anne Fulwood (1959- ) – Reporter, journalist and writer
Ken I'Anson – Motor cycle racer –  Australian Sidecar Champion, Australian Pairs Champion, SA Champion, multiple Australian Track Champion, Australian speedway champion
John Percival Jennings, AO, ISM, RDA (1923-2003) – Senior Horticultural Adviser and fruit grower. John P Jennings Park in Waikerie named after him.
John T. Jennings, BSc(Hons), PhD (1950-) – Entomologist, The University of Adelaide. President of the Royal Society of South Australia (2008-2010). Editor Natural history of the Riverland and Murraylands, Occasional publications of the Royal Society of South Australia; no. 9 (2009).
Kym Vincent Lehmann (1946-) – Australian Rules Football player, North Adelaide Football Club,
Bruce Malcolm Light (1949-2018) – Australian Rules Football player, Port Adelaide Football Club
Geoffrey (Geoff) Haydon Manning (1926-2018) – Unionist, author and historian
Mark Ricciuto (1975-) – Australian Rules Football player, West Adelaide and Adelaide Crows football clubs. Joint winner 2003 Brownlow Medal
Brian Webber BSc(Hons), MSc, PhD  – Australian Rules Football player, West Adelaide Football Club. Headmaster of Prince Alfred College, Adelaide (1988–1999)
Chris Western (1974–) Off Road Racer BAJA 1000 Ironman in 2014

Gallery

See also
List of crossings of the Murray River

References

External links

Waikerie Tourism
Waikerie Gliding Club

Towns in South Australia
Populated places on the Murray River
Australian soldier settlements
Riverland